KIOR-LP (98.1 FM) is a low power radio station broadcasting a variety format. The station is operated by the Independent Omaha Radio Project, Inc. The station serves eastern Omaha and western Council Bluffs.

References

External links
 

Radio stations in Omaha, Nebraska
Radio stations established in 2017
IOR-LP
2017 establishments in Nebraska